Honey Creek Township may refer to:

Illinois
 Honey Creek Township, Adams County, Illinois
 Honey Creek Township, Crawford County, Illinois

Indiana
 Honey Creek Township, Howard County, Indiana
 Honey Creek Township, Vigo County, Indiana
 Honey Creek Township, White County, Indiana

Iowa
 Honey Creek Township, Delaware County, Iowa
 Honey Creek Township, Iowa County, Iowa

Missouri
 Honey Creek Township, Henry County, Missouri

Township name disambiguation pages